Communauté d'agglomération Arche Agglo is the communauté d'agglomération, an intercommunal structure, centred on the town of Tournon-sur-Rhône. It is located in the Ardèche and Drôme departments, in the Auvergne-Rhône-Alpes region, southeastern France. Created in 2017, its seat is in Mauves. Its area is 498.0 km2. Its population was 57,897 in 2019, of which 10,622 in Tournon-sur-Rhône proper.

Composition
The communauté d'agglomération consists of the following 41 communes, of which 21 in the Drôme department:

Arlebosc
Arthémonay
Bathernay
Beaumont-Monteux
Boucieu-le-Roi
Bozas
Bren
Chanos-Curson
Chantemerle-les-Blés
Charmes-sur-l'Herbasse
Chavannes
Cheminas
Colombier-le-Jeune
Colombier-le-Vieux
Crozes-Hermitage
Érôme
Étables
Gervans
Glun
Larnage
La Roche-de-Glun
Lemps
Margès
Marsaz
Mauves
Mercurol-Veaunes
Montchenu
Pailharès
Plats
Pont-de-l'Isère
Saint-Barthélemy-le-Plain
Saint-Donat-sur-l'Herbasse
Saint-Félicien
Saint-Jean-de-Muzols
Saint-Victor
Sécheras
Serves-sur-Rhône
Tain-l'Hermitage
Tournon-sur-Rhône
Vaudevant
Vion

References

Arche Agglo
Arche Agglo
Arche Agglo